Mariano Catalino Pesoa (born 30 April 1952) is a former Paraguayan footballer (central midfielder). Pesoa was a member of Paraguay national team and he won 1979 Copa América with the team.

Honours
 Cerro Porteño
 Paraguayan Primera División: 1977
 Paraguay
 Copa América: 1979

References

External links
 
 

1952 births
Living people
Paraguayan footballers
Paraguay international footballers
Copa América-winning players
1979 Copa América players
Club Sol de América footballers
Cerro Porteño players
Deportivo Recoleta footballers
Association football midfielders